Route 33 is a  state highway contained entirely within the city of Chicopee and the town of South Hadley in Massachusetts. Its southern terminus is at Route 141 and its northern terminus is at Route 116.

Route description
Route 33 begins at Route 141 just north of the Chicopee River in the Chicopee Falls section of the city.  It crosses under the Massachusetts Turnpike, with the entrance ramps for Exit 5 just north of this.  It passes west of Westover Joint Air Reserve Base before entering the town of South Hadley.  Once in South Hadley, the road crosses U.S. Route 202, which leads westward towards Holyoke, as it turns northeast, ending at Route 116, the street itself continuing as Lyman Street.

Major intersections

References

033
Transportation in Hampden County, Massachusetts
Transportation in Hampshire County, Massachusetts